Daniel Camille Victor Marie Labille (15 October 1932 – 31 December 2022) was a French Roman Catholic prelate.

Labille was born in France and was ordained to the priesthood in 1956. Labille served as titular bishop of Fata and was auxiliary bishop of the Roman Catholic Diocese of Soissonsm France from 1978 to 1984 and as bishop of the Soissons Diocese from 1984 to 1998. Labille then served as bishop of the Roman Catholic Diocese of Créteil from 1998 until his retirement in 2007.

References

1932 births
2022 deaths
Bishops of Soissons
Bishops appointed by Pope John Paul II